Pierre Ollivier (born 1890) was a Belgian wrestler. He was Olympic silver medalist in Freestyle wrestling in 1924.

References

1890 births
Date of death unknown
Olympic wrestlers of Belgium
Wrestlers at the 1924 Summer Olympics
Belgian male sport wrestlers
Olympic silver medalists for Belgium
Olympic medalists in wrestling
Medalists at the 1924 Summer Olympics
20th-century Belgian people